FuseFX is a motion picture special visual effects (VFX) company headquartered in Los Angeles, California. Their creative studios include FuseFX, Folks VFX, Rising Sun Pictures and El Ranchito. Established in 2006, the company develops visual effects for television and film projects, along with virtual reality experiences.

History

Founding
FuseFX was founded in 2006 as The Outfit by David Altenau, with co-partners Tim Jacobson and Jason Fotter.

Expansion and acquisitions
2014: FuseFX expanded by launching offices in Vancouver and New York City.

2016: FuseFX consolidated its multiple locations in Burbank to a larger campus in Sherman Oaks.

2018: EagleTree Capital, a New York-based private equity and investment firm, acquired a majority stake in FuseFX. The Investment group provides financial backing to support continued growth globally as the studio scales to support larger and more complex productions.

2020, February: FuseFX opened its third office, located in Atlanta.

2020, April: FuseFX acquires Folks VFX, adding locations in Montreal, Toronto, and Bogota Colombia.

2021, April: FuseFX acquires Rising Sun Pictures a high-end visual effects studio headquartered in Adelaide, South Australia. Rising Sun Pictures co-founder Tony Clark continues to lead the studio.

2021, November: FuseFX opens a new Folks VFX studio in Saguenay, Québec. The Saguenay location operates as an extension of the Montréal facility and aims to create 60 to 70 skilled jobs with this expansion. The Saguenay location becomes the tenth studio location in the FuseFX portfolio and brings the number of global employees to over 1000.

2022, June: FuseFX acquires El Ranchito VFX based out of Madrid, Spain with additional location in Barcelona.

2022, August: FuseFX sister studio FOLKS opens Mumbai studio location.

Description
The company has offices in Los Angeles, New York, Vancouver, BC, Atlanta, Montreal, Toronto, Bogota, Saguenay, Adelaide, Brisbane, Madrid, Barcelona, and Mumbai

Film and television credits

Film credits

Wendell & Wild (2022)
The Kissing Booth 2 (2020)
Annabelle Comes Home (2019)
Captive State (2019)
Super Troopers 2 (2018)
Tomb Raider (2018) - Additional Visual Effects
Vice (2018)
The Current War: Director's Cut (2017) - Additional Visual Effects
American Made (2017) - Additional Visual Effects
Wish Upon (2017)
The Wall (2017)
The Purge: Election Year (2016)
Winter Light (2015)
Jessabelle (2014)
Annabelle (film) (2014)
The Giver (2014) Lidar and Cyber Scanning
Sinister (2012)
Volcano Girl (2011)
Faster (2010) - Additional visual effects

Television credits 
FuseFX's work has appeared in episodes of Criminal Minds, Marvel's Agents of S.H.I.E.L.D., American Horror Story, The Blacklist, and Preacher, among others.

Other TV credits include:

 Ms. Marvel (2022)
 The Terminal List (2022)
 A League of Their Own (TV series) (2022)
 Winning Time The Rise of the Lakers Dynasty (2022)
 Raising Dion (2022)
 DMZ (2022)
 Naomi (2022)
 Dexter (2022)
 Loki (2021)
 Them: Convenant (2021)
 The Flight Attendant (2021)
 Debris (2021)
 Ratched (2020)
 Upload (2020)
 Snowpiercer (2020)
 Outer Banks (2020)
 Hollywood (2020)
 Penny Dreadful: City of Angels (2020)
 Agents of S.H.I.E.L.D. Seasons 1-7 (2013-2020)
 Mayans M.C. Season 2 (2019)
 The Tick Seasons 1-2 (2017-2019)
 American Crime Story Seasons 1-2 (2016-2018)
 Luke Cage Season 1 (2016)
 Bosch Season 3 (2016)
 The 100 Seasons 6-7 (2019-2020)
 American Horror Story Seasons 1-10 (2011-2019)
 Hell on Wheels Seasons 2-4 (2012-2014)
 The Chicago Code (2011)
 Green Eggs and Ham (2022)

Awards and nominations

References

External links 
 

Visual effects companies
Companies based in Los Angeles